The Fiuman dialect is the dialect of the Venetian language spoken in the Croatian city of Rijeka (Fiume). It is strongly influenced by  Croatian Chakavian, Hungarian, German substrates, mainly due to the closeness between two different cultures (the Romanic and the Slavic one) and Austro-Hungarian rule.

Thus, because Rijeka was under the Habsburg monarchy for over five centuries (1466–1918) and part of the Holy Roman Empire for nine centuries, many of the words are of German and Hungarian origin. Due to extensive emigration to the growing port city during the late 18th and 19th centuries, many words also came from other languages, such as Slovenian.

Significant is the amount of literary production carried out in this small dialect, with some of the main local authors using it in their works being Mario Schittar, Gino Antoni, Oscarre Russi, Egidio Milinovich.

Origin and use 

Experts say about this dialect: "(...) the Croatian language and a variant of the Venetian language certainly coexisted in the city as early as the fifteenth century (...), but taking into account all the historical facts, i.e. that in the ninth and tenth century Venetian merchants, sailors and statesmen on the eastern Adriatic coast already spoke Venetian, the latter was probably spoken even earlier."

"Whether the Fiuman dialect is fundamentally a continuation of the language of the autochthonous Romance population with a subsequent stratification of Venetisms or whether its basis is a specific mix of the various Italian dialects of the Italian settlers from the thirteenth century onwards with a later gradual Venetian stratification, it coexisted in Rijeka with the Croats' Chakavian dialect for centuries."

The Fiuman pedagogist Gemma Harasim wrote in 1909: "the Italian language (i.e. Fiuman) is equally understood by almost all of the inhabitants: especially by the Croats, many of whom, in fact, speak it at home and in social life, despite being politically opposed to Italians; Italian is also spoken, although somewhat less well and with a thick exotic accent, by almost all of the Hungarians who come to live here. Therefore the Italian language certainly remains the common language of all nationalities: in peaceful business relations, in conversations and in families, it is almost a general rule that when Hungarians, Croats and Italians meet, the language of exchange remains Italian."

Because the great majority of Italians left the city after the Second World War, Fiuman is now reduced to a minority language, spoken by 2-5% of Rijeka's population.

References

External links 
Books on the subject published by the Croatian Ministry of Science and Technology
The Society of Fiuman Studies official homepage

Culture in Rijeka
Venetian language
Languages attested from the 15th century
City colloquials